Acoustic Kingdom Underground is the first EP of singer-songwriter Matt Duke and his second offering from Rykodisc.  It was released in the US on June 30, 2009.

History
Months after the tour and release of Kingdom Underground, Ryko asked Duke to record a supplemental EP of acoustic tracks to the Kingdom Underground album that was called Acoustic Kingdom Underground.  This was to match the feel and sound of Duke's live shows, as he was touring solo without a band. The producer of that EP, Jason Finkel, would later become the producer of Duke's next full-length release, One Day Die.

All of the songs from the album come from the release of Kingdom Underground with the exception of "Ash Like Snow", a song that had been written years earlier.

Track listing
All songs written by Matt Duke, except for "The Father, The Son and The Harlot's Ghost" and "Walk It Off" which are written by Matt Duke/Marshall Altman.

Personnel

Musicians
 Matt Duke: Vocals, Acoustic Guitar

Production
 Jason Finkel: Producer, Engineer, Mixer
 Kevin Blackler: Masterer
 Doug Seymour: Photography
 Jamie Hoyt-Vitale: Design

References

Rykodisc albums
2009 albums